Three ships of the Royal Navy have borne the name HMS Bedford, named initially after William Russell, created Duke of Bedford in May 1694 and not after the town of Bedford:

  was a 70-gun third rate launched in 1698.  She was rebuilt in 1741 to carry 64-guns, was hulked in 1767 and sold in 1787.
  was a 74-gun third rate launched in 1775.  She was used as a prison ship from 1801 and was broken up in 1817.
  was a  armoured cruiser launched in 1901.  She was wrecked in 1910 and the wreck was sold later that year.

In film
HMS Bedford is a fictional Type 23 frigate featured in the 18th James Bond feature film Tomorrow Never Dies. She was instrumental in the destruction of Elliot Carver's stealth ship.

See also
  was a 34-gun fifth rate launched in 1697, and purchased that year for Navy service.  She was rebuilt in 1709 and converted into a fire ship in 1716.  She was sunk as a foundation at Sheerness in 1725.

Royal Navy ship names